John Gilbert King (1822 – 9 January 1901) was an Irish Conservative Party politician.

Family

He was the son of Henry King and Harriett, daughter of John Lloyd, who had been a Member of the Irish House of Commons for King's County before the Act of Union. He inherited Ballylin House from his father in 1857 and, because he was unmarried with no children, this was passed to his nephew Henry Louis Mahon, son of Ross Mahon and Harriett King.

Political career
At the 1865 general election, he was elected to the House of Commons of the United Kingdom as one of the two Members of Parliament (MPs) for King's County.  He stood down at the next election, in 1868.

Other activities
He was a Justice of the Peace and High Sheriff of King's County for 1852–53.

References

External links
 

1822 births
1901 deaths
Irish Conservative Party MPs
High Sheriffs of King's County
UK MPs 1865–1868
Members of the Parliament of the United Kingdom for King's County constituencies (1801–1922)